Titan Stadium is a 10,000-capacity multi-purpose stadium on the campus of California State University, Fullerton in Fullerton, California.

History
Scheduled to open in time for the 1991 football season, delays caused the opening date of Titan Stadium to be pushed back until 1992.  Despite originally being planned as the home stadium for the Cal State Fullerton Titans football program, the delays in stadium construction put in question the possibility of the team actually taking the field.  Budget cuts and strict NCAA regulations eventually signaled the end of the football program in 1992 after playing one season at the stadium. Since Titan Stadium was designed to host the football team, it is one of the most lavish soccer stadiums in Southern California.

Amenities
Titan Stadium has 2,000 chairback seats and 2,500 bleachers seats with backrests on the western side of the stadium.  In addition, there are concrete steps on the opposite side which can hold nearly 5,000 extra people.  The pitch features an underground drainage system that allows it to be almost perfectly flat.  The main press box seats over 50 people and features 10 separate booths used for broadcasting, hospitality, etc.

Tenants

CSUF Titans
The stadium is home to the CSUF Titans men's soccer and CSUF Titans women's soccer teams. 

The Cal State Fullerton Titans football team played at the stadium in 1992.

Other teams and events
Titan Stadium was one of the hosts of the Los Angeles Salsa, a former professional soccer team in the now defunct American Professional Soccer League between 1993 and 1994. The Los Angeles Galaxy used the field as their home ground during their run to the 2001 Lamar Hunt U.S. Open Cup.  In addition to professional soccer, NCAA Tournament games were also hosted in 1994, 1996, 1998, and 2005.  The United States men's national soccer team has used Titan Stadium to host international soccer matches as well.

In addition to being a soccer stadium, Titan Stadium has been featured in television programs and commercials due to its proximity to Los Angeles. The UCLA Bruins have previously used the stadium as a practice field for their football program, once again bringing the sport to the CSUF Titans campus.

The Los Angeles Blues soccer team of USL Pro also played their home games at Titan Stadium.

The Angel City FC soccer team of National Women's Soccer League will play their home games at Titan Stadium during the 2022 NWSL Challenge Cup.

Gallery

See also
List of soccer stadiums in the United States

References

External links

College soccer venues in California
Defunct college football venues
Cal State Fullerton Titans football
Los Angeles Salsa
Sports venues in Fullerton, California
Sports venues completed in 1992
1992 establishments in California
Cal State Fullerton Titans soccer
Former National Women's Soccer League stadiums
Soccer venues in California
Angel City FC
LA Galaxy
Los Angeles FC